Sympistis sanina is a species of moth in the family Noctuidae (the owlet moths).

The MONA or Hodges number for Sympistis sanina is 10094.

References

Further reading

 
 
 

sanina
Articles created by Qbugbot
Moths described in 1910